Helon is a word that appears in the Bible.

Helon may refer to:

People

Given named
 Helon (biblical figure), an Israelite of the Tribe of Zebulun
 Helon Blount (1929–2005), U.S. actress
 Helon Habila (born 1967), Nigerian writer
 Helon Ollivierre (1881–1907), Trinidadian cricketer

Surnamed
 George Helon (born 1965), Australian writer

Places
 Hélon, Villers-Hélon, Villers-Cotterêts, Soissons, Aisne, Picardy, Hauts-de-France, France

Other uses
 helon, a form of preon theoretical sub-quark particle
 Helon	(stock ticker: 000677); see List of companies listed on the Shenzhen Stock Exchange
 Helon language

See also

 Helot
 
 Helen (disambiguation)
 Helion (disambiguation)
 Helium (disambiguation)
 Hel (disambiguation)

Disambiguation pages with surname-holder lists